Point After is a program that aired on the NFL Network. This program contained press conferences and interviews given by National Football League and college football players and coaches. Most material was pre-recorded, but occasionally the network went live to the press briefings.

The show aired Monday through Friday during the football season. The starting time is 4 p.m. Eastern time, for Tuesday-Friday and for Monday at 8:30 p.m. Eastern time. The hosts were Fran Charles, Derrin Horton and Alex Flanagan. Jim E. Mora, Jamie Dukes and Adam Schefter provided analysis.

Show history
Point After has been on NFL Network from its beginning during the 2003 season. The original version was basically an automated program that aired on Sunday nights. A voice-over announcer briefly described the games of that NFL Sunday, then the comments of the players and coaches in that game aired.

When NFLN revamped for 2006, mainly to mark the start of live regular-season play-by-play, this program became NFL Scoreboard and Point After became a more polished five-day-a-week show. Also, college soundbites were added as part of an additional emphasis on collegiate football.

Successor
In 2008, NFL Network cancelled this program and replaced it with Team Cam, which has a similar format but which also includes contributions from beat writers and bloggers.  The host is Randy Moss (the former ESPN sportscaster, not the New England Patriots wide receiver of the same name). It airs weekdays at 4 p.m. Eastern time for two hours an episode.

References 

NFL Network original programming
2003 American television series debuts
2008 American television series endings